Dorcadion inikliense is a species of beetle in the family Cerambycidae. It was described by Bernhauer and Peks in 2010.

References

inikliense
Beetles described in 2010